Gilbert Rugby is a sports equipment manufacturing brand, specialising in rugby union and netball. The company is mostly known for its rugby union balls, having been official supplier for every World Cup since 1995.

History
The company was established by William Gilbert, a cobbler, in 1823, who along with his nephew, James, developed footballs for the neighbouring Rugby School. In 2002, after experiencing financial difficulties following a management buyout, Gilbert was purchased by Grays International.

Gilbert is the long-standing official ball supplier for the England, Wales, Scotland, Australia, South Africa, France, Italy and Argentina rugby unions. They also provide balls for  world Netball. Gilbert is also the official ball supplier of the ANZ Championship, the biggest netball competition in the world and also the official supplier of the Netball World Championships. Their products include the Gilbert Synergie rugby ball.

In September 2014, Gilbert Rugby launched the "Match-XV" ball, which was developed specifically for the 2015 World Cup held in England. The Match-XV match ball was used throughout the Premiership Rugby, Top 14 and by all Gilbert-sponsored national unions in the test matches in November 2015.

Products
The following table details products manufactured and commercialised by Gilbert for rugby union and netball markets.

Sponsorships
The following teams, associations and players wear uniforms and equipment provided by Gilbert:

Rugby

National teams 

 Belgium
 UAE

Club teams 

 Pasteur Athletique Club
 Otago (National Provincial Championship)
 Dragons/Newport
 Berkshire Shire Hall RFC

Players

  Matt Gilbert
  Thierry Dusautoir
  Seán Cronin
  Matthew Dempsey
  Blair Cowan
  Cheslin Kolbe
  Jake Ball
  Aaron Shingler
  Richard Hibbard
  Michael Hooper

Netball
  Australia
  Jamaica
  New Zealand

References

External links

 
 Gilbert Netball

Sporting goods manufacturers of the United Kingdom
British brands
Sportswear brands
Manufacturing companies established in 1823
1823 establishments in England
British companies established in 1823